David Adams and Andrei Olhovskiy were the defending champions but only Olhovskiy competed that year with Patrick Galbraith.

Galbraith and Olhovskiy lost in the first round to Neil Broad and Piet Norval.

Rick Leach and Scott Melville won in the final 6–1, 2–6, 6–1 against Kent Kinnear and Dave Randall.

Seeds
Champion seeds are indicated in bold text while text in italics indicates the round in which those seeds were eliminated.

 Patrick Galbraith /  Andrei Olhovskiy (first round)
 Rick Leach /  Scott Melville (champions)
 Menno Oosting /  Guillaume Raoux (quarterfinals)
 Jan Apell /  Peter Nyborg (semifinals)

Draw

References
 1996 Indonesia Open Doubles Draw

Jakarta Open
1996 ATP Tour